Djahangir Almasi (born 21 March 1950 in Tehran, Iran) is an Iranian actor.

He has played different roles in his career, but he is known mainly as an actor who plays serious and intellectual roles. He started his career with Stemming from Blood (1984) and has also directed a short film. Almasi was awarded the lifetime achievement award at the 31st Fajr International Film Festival.

Selected filmography
 Stemming from Blood, 1983
 Monster, 1985
 Spectre of the Scorpion, 1986
 Nar & Ney, 1988
 Portrait of Love, 1990
 The Fall
 End of Childhood, 1993
 Banichaw
 The Poor Lover, 1995
 Sohrab, 1999
 Ranj Va Sarmasti, 1999
 Sib va Salma, 1999
 The Couch, 1999
 The Dinosaur, 1999
 Behind the Mist, 1999
 The Spruce, 1999
 Sohrab, 1999
 The Punishment Committee, 1999
 A Portrait of Love, 1999
 Exit, 2019

References

External links
 

Iranian male film actors
Iranian male stage actors
Iranian male television actors
1950 births
Living people
Popular Front of Islamic Revolution Forces politicians